Preppie! is an action video game for the Atari 8-bit family published by Adventure International in 1982. It was programmed by Russ Wetmore of Star Systems Software, whose name is prominently displayed on the box cover. Leaning on the preppy trend of the early 1980s, the game follows prep schooler Wadsworth Overcash as he navigates the hazards of a country club to retrieve golf balls. Preppie! borrows heavily from Konami's Frogger, with lanes of traffic in the bottom half of the screen and a river crossing the top portion. Alligators are an element from both Frogger and preppy fashion; an open-mouthed gator is  the icon of shirt brand Izod. Reviewers recognized the game as derivative, but called the music and visuals some of the best for Atari 8-bit computers.

Preppie! was followed by a maze game, Preppie! II, from the same author in 1983. In January 2016, Russ Wetmore released the source code for both games.

Gameplay

Like Frogger, the player must cross lanes of traffic, then jump between floating objects to reach the other side of a river. The frog is recast as a preppy, and the setting moved to a country club where traffic consists of golf carts and reel mower-pushing groundskeepers. Canoes, logs, and alligators occupy the water.

Instead of simply getting to the other side as in Frogger, the goal is to retrieve all of the golf balls and return them to the bottom of the screen. Each ball requires a separate  trip. The golf  balls appear either in the strip between the two areas or on the far side of the river.

There are ten levels. A bonus preppie is given for reaching 8,000 points.

Development
Russ Wetmore's then-spouse, Diana, suggested a "cartoonish" style of game. Wetmore took inspiration from the preppy fad spawned by 1980's The Official Preppy Handbook. He wrote the game on an Atari 800 in eight weeks using the Atari Macro Assembler. Being more familiar with Z80 assembly language from programming the TRS-80, he used macros to give a Z80 flavor to 6502 code.

The main musical theme is an arrangement of Humoresque Op. 101 No. 7 by Antonín Dvořák.

Reception
In a 1982 review for Antic, Robert DeWitt concluded "Al has a real winner here, even if the 'cover' concept is only remotely related to the game."  Bill Kunkel of Electronic Games called it a "Frogger-inspired delight." He clarified: "Sure it sounds familiar, but what elevates Preppie! from the score of Frogger-clones on the software market is the enchanting four-part harmony sound effects and the stunning graphics."

John J. Anderson of Creative Computing Video & Arcade Games stated that although gameplay is not original "the implementation is gorgeous." A COMPUTE! review also lauded the graphics and stated, "this program easily ranks among the best games to appear for the Atari computer to date." The Book of Atari Software 1983 gave a rating of B-minus, writing "Animation and graphics are very good" and "I can't say it's very original in design; but, like Frogger, it is lots of fun."

In an "Antic Pix Ten" article, Antic chose Preppie! as "among the most popular, interesting, and valuable programs yet written for your amusement." In the January 1983 issue of Joystik, David and Sandy Small included Preppie! on a similar list of their ten "most heavily played, and most recommended, games."

Legacy

Preppie! II
Released in 1983, Preppie! II is a maze game where the object is to paint the corridors pink by moving through them. Elements of the original return as obstacles, including giant frogs, golf carts, and lawn mowers.

Preppie! 3
Wetmore mentioned a possible third game in the series when interviewed by Electronic Games in 1983, giving the tentative title as Preppies in Space. He was asked about this in 2005, and his response was posted to the AtariAge forums:

See also
Pacific Coast Highway (1982)

References 

Bibliography

External links
Preppie! at Atari Mania

1982 video games
Adventure International games
Atari 8-bit family games
Atari 8-bit family-only games
Commercial video games with freely available source code
Top-down video games
Video game clones
Video games developed in the United States